Thomas William Cotman (1847, Bermondsey – 30 October 1925 Felixstowe) was an English architect and painter active in Felixstowe.

Family
Thomas was born into the Cotman family of artists. His parents were Henry Edmund Cotman (1802–1871), formerly a Norwich silk merchant and his wife Maria Taylor (1813–1895). His elder brother was Henry Edmund Cotman (1844–1914) also born in London, but his younger brother, Frederick George Cotman was born in Ipswich whither the family had moved.

Architectural work
Cotman was influenced by the Arts and Crafts Movement and was responsible for a number of Arts and Crafts style buildings in Felixstowe.

Gallery

References

1847 births
1925 deaths
People from Bermondsey
19th-century English architects
19th-century English painters
20th-century English architects
20th-century English painters